Michael Bauer may refer to:

 Michael Bauer (artist) (born 1973), German artist
 Michael Gerard Bauer (born 1955), Australian author
 Michael Bauer (basketball) (born 1980), American basketball player
 Mike Bauer (born 1959), American tennis player
 Michael Bauer (officer) (1895–1943), German officer
 Michael Bauer, a character in Fashion House
 Michael W. Bauer (born 1969), German political scientist
 Michael Bauer, the food critic of the San Francisco Chronicle for 32 years